Vahid (Persian: وحيد) is the Persian, Kurmanji Kurdish and Bosnian variant of the Arabic masculine given name Wahid, meaning "The One", "Unique". People named Vahid include:

Given name

Vahid
 Vahid Amiri (born 1988), Iranian footballer
 Vahid Halilhodžić (born 1952), Bosnian football manager
 Vahid Hambo (born 1995), Finnish footballer of Bosnian descent
 Vahid Hashemian (born 1976), Iranian footballer
 Vahid Shamsaei (born 1975), Iranian futsal player
 Vahid Talebloo (born 1992), Iranian footballer
 Vahid Tarokh (born c. 1967), Iranian academic

Vahit
 Vahit Kirişci (born 1960), Turkish politician
 Vahit Melih Halefoğlu (1919–2017), Turkish politician and diplomat
 Vahit Emre Savaş (born 1995), Turkish volleyball player

Middle name
 Hossein Vahid Khorasani (born 1921), Iranian grand ayatollah

Surname
 Hamid Vahid-Dastjerdi (born 1959), Iranian academic and philosopher

See also
 Vahide, feminine form of the name

References

Iranian masculine given names
Bosniak masculine given names
Bosnian masculine given names
Turkish masculine given names